The Fighting Coward is a 1924 American silent comedy film produced by Famous Players-Lasky, released by Paramount Pictures, and directed by James Cruze. The film stars Ernest Torrence, Mary Astor, Noah Beery, Sr., Phyllis Haver, and Cullen Landis. The film is based on the play Magnolia by Booth Tarkington, from 1904.

Plot
As described in a film magazine review, prior to the American Civil War, Tom Rumford, Southern born but reared by Philadelphia relatives, returns to Mississippi when 21 years old and becomes engaged to his cousin Elvira. Unused to the stern traditions of the Southern code of honor, he is driven from home in disgrace, stigmatized as being a coward, and loses his sweetheart's love when he refuses a challenge to fight a duel. Later, he meets General Orlando Jackson, a famous gunfighter. Jackson develops the young man into a dangerous shot and fighting man under the name Colonel Blake. With his honor cleared, he returns to his Mississippi home and visits his folks, who now bow down to him, and he weds Elvira's younger sister Lucy.

Cast

Preservation
Copies of The Fighting Coward survive in the Library of Congress, George Eastman House, and in the Gosfilmofond archive in Moscow.

References

External links

Lobby poster (click for large image)
The poster expanded in its own tab window

1924 films
1920s English-language films
1924 comedy films
Silent American comedy films
American silent feature films
Films directed by James Cruze
Famous Players-Lasky films
Films based on works by Booth Tarkington
American black-and-white films
1920s American films